Kim Tae-hun (born August 15, 1994) is a South Korean taekwondo practitioner.

Sports career

During the 2013 World Taekwondo Championships Kim won gold in finweight, defeating Chia Lin-hsu. at the 2015 World Taekwondo Championships Kim defended his title, defeating Stanislav Denisov. He won his third consecutive gold in the same weight category at the 2017 World Taekwondo Championships in Muju beating the Iranian Armin Hadipour in the final.

He won the gold medal in the finweight division (under 54 kg) at the 2014 Asian Games in Incheon, South Korea.

In the 2016 Rio Olympics, he lost to eventual runner-up Tawin Hanprab of Thailand in their high scoring Preliminary Round match but was able to win the bronze medal through the repechage rounds.

References

External links
 

South Korean male taekwondo practitioners
1994 births
Living people
Asian Games medalists in taekwondo
Taekwondo practitioners at the 2014 Asian Games
Asian Games gold medalists for South Korea
Taekwondo practitioners at the 2016 Summer Olympics
Medalists at the 2016 Summer Olympics
Olympic bronze medalists for South Korea
Olympic taekwondo practitioners of South Korea
Olympic medalists in taekwondo
Medalists at the 2014 Asian Games
Taekwondo practitioners at the 2018 Asian Games
Medalists at the 2018 Asian Games
World Taekwondo Championships medalists
Asian Taekwondo Championships medalists
People from Wonju
21st-century South Korean people